Barlon Sequeira (born 25 May 1998) is a Costa Rican professional footballer who plays for Sporting San José in the Liga FPD.

Career
Sequeuira made his league debut for Liga Deportiva Alajuelense on August 28, 2016 against San Carlos. In October 2020 he signed a new contract with the club of which he said he “had dreamt of playing for as a child” to take him up to 2023. Sequeira was an ever present during Apertura 2020 when Alajuelense won the national title. However, the following season, with the arrival of Albert Rudé as the new manager, Sequeira saw fewer opportunities and a transfer to Sporting San José followed in 2022.

International career
He made his debut for the Costa Rica national football team on the 17 October 2018 against Colombia at the Red Bull Arena (New Jersey).

Honours

Alajuelense
 Liga FPD: Apertura 2020
 CONCACAF League: 2020

References

1998 births
Living people
Costa Rica international footballers
Association football midfielders
Costa Rican footballers
L.D. Alajuelense footballers